Uh Huh Her is the sixth studio album by English alternative rock musician PJ Harvey. The album was written, recorded and produced over a two-year period by the singer-songwriter herself. She also played every instrument on the album (the first such project since 4-Track Demos in 1993) with the exception of the final drum tracks, added by long-time collaborator Rob Ellis. It was released on 31 May 2004 in the United Kingdom, and 8 June 2004 in the United States.

During the accompanying  tour that lasted eight months, she performed the album's unreleased title-track. Uh Huh Her debuted and peaked at number 12 in the UK Albums Chart and has been certified Silver by the BPI. It became Harvey's highest charting album to date in the U.S., peaking at number 29 in the Billboard 200, and had sold more than 135,000 copies there as of 2005, according to AskBillboard. Although it charted higher than Stories from the City, Stories from the Sea in many territories, Uh Huh Her failed to achieve its predecessor's chart longevity and crossover interest.

The album received largely positive reviews upon its release, although there was some criticism of its production. It currently holds a 79 out of 100 metascore at Metacritic based upon 28 reviews, indicating "generally favorable reviews". Uh Huh Her also earned PJ Harvey nominations to awards such as the Grammy Awards and the Brit Awards.

History 
The album was written and recorded over a two-year period in Dorset, East Devon and Los Angeles. Much of the recording was done alone by Harvey using her four-track and eight-track home studio, guitar, keyboards and drum machine. For the first time since 1993's 4-Track Demos album, she produced it herself and played every instrument bar the final drum tracks, which were handled by her longtime collaborator Rob Ellis. Final recording and mixing was done by Head at the Presshouse Studio in rural East Devon in autumn/winter 2003.

Harvey told Mojo magazine, "I don't think 'tender' is a word that could be applied to anything I've written before, but that's how I feel about this album and I'm really pleased about it. Some of the songs are very gentle, very loving; with others I had a lot of fun in the words I used and the way I sang them." She explained to Time Out magazine how she "wanted to get back to the earthy, rootsy, more dirty side of things" following the popular success of her last album, 2000's Stories from the City, Stories from the Sea. She said, "I wanted this record to be simple, I wanted it to be ugly in some places, I wanted it to have a swagger to it... but also a real honesty and intimacy. I wanted a warmness and closeness and I wanted to make a welcoming record." To Spin magazine she said that, in contrast to the extreme darkness of some of her earlier LPs, "I find an enormous amount of openness and hope on this record... "The Desperate Kingdom of Love" or "You Come Through" I find incredibly optimistic and tender." Harvey also explained to Tracks magazine that, "I was looking for distressed, debased sounds. So all of the guitars are either tuned so low that it's hard to detect what notes they're playing or they're baritone guitars or they're played through the shittiest amps I could find."

On the inside sleeve of the album cover are a long set of self-portrait photographs that Harvey took over the years, and a series of scribbled annotations she collected during the songwriting process of Uh Huh Her – notes to herself such as "Scare yourself", "Too normal? Too PJ H?" and "All that matters is my voice and my story" (a piece of advice given to her by her friend Elvis Costello). She admitted to Shaken Stir that producing the record on her own was "a completely draining, disorientating, exasperating, invigorating experience" and "one of the hardest pieces of work I've ever done... I couldn't say that this record was an enjoyable experience. I think it was a journey that I learnt an enormous amount from, but certainly there were very enjoyable moments... I mean when I look back on it now it was a very difficult, hard and taxing time, and yet I'm so glad I did it – so glad."

Harvey underwent an eight month world tour in support of the album with drummer Rob Ellis and two new bandmates, bass player Dingo and guitarist Josh Klinghoffer. The tour was captured for the DVD On Tour: Please Leave Quietly.

A song called "Uh Huh Her" was regularly played during the tour, but not included on the album. It was eventually recorded for the digital compilation iTunes Originals – PJ Harvey. On the origin of album's title PJ Harvey mentioned it in Rolling Stone in 2004: "But it came from the chorus of a song, actually — there’s a song called “Uh Huh Her” that I play live but I chose never to record. The chorus is: “Don’t marry uh huh her/Don’t marry her her her.”"

Reception 

Uh Huh Her was released in May 2004 in the UK and peaked at #12 in the UK Albums Chart. The album was preceded by lead single "The Letter", which reached #28 in the UK Singles Chart. Uh Huh Her became PJ Harvey's highest-charting record on the US Billboard charts, reaching #29. Overall, however, it did not spark the same level of crossover interest as its million-selling predecessor Stories from the City, Stories from the Sea. As usual with Harvey, the critical reception was generally strong: Alternative Press described the record as "profoundly moving", Entertainment Weekly called it "raw, dark and beautiful... a jagged, edgy winner", and Time noted that "No singer since Janis Joplin has moved as easily between primal scream and intimate sigh". The Sunday Times hailed it as "a thrilling, bone-rattling barrage, interleaved with moments of hushed, accordion-flecked intimacy whose closeness and apparent candour make you want to shield yourself from their passion." Hot Press magazine, meanwhile, felt it was "an extremely potent record... that contains more perspectives, characters and camera angles than maybe any PJ album to date". It won Harvey her sixth BRIT Award nomination, as Best British Female Artist, and her fifth Grammy Award nomination, for Best Alternative Music Performance of 2004.

Accolades

Track listing

Personnel 
Credits adapted from Uh Huh Hers liner notes.

PJ Harvey – vocals, guitars, bass, piano, melodica, accordion, autoharp, producer, engineer, mixing, photography
Rob Ellis – drums, percussion, backing vocals (3)
Head – backing vocals (3, 5), engineer, mixing
Evelyn Isaac – backing vocals (7, 14)
Technical
Maria Mochnacz – artwork
Rob Crane – artwork

Charts

Weekly charts

Singles

Certifications

References

External links 

2004 albums
PJ Harvey albums
Island Records albums
Lo-fi music albums